LIM homeobox transcription factor 1-beta, also known as LMX1B, is a protein which in humans is encoded by the LMX1B gene.

Function 

LMX1B is a LIM homeobox transcription factor which plays a central role in dorso-ventral patterning of the vertebrate limb.

Clinical significance 

Loss-of-function mutations in the LMX1B gene are associated with Nail-patella syndrome.

References

Further reading

External links
  GeneReviews/NIH/NCBI/UW entry on Nail-Patella Syndrome